1962 Major League Baseball All-Star Game may refer to:

The 1962 Major League Baseball All-Star Game (first game), a 3–1 victory for the National League over the American League
The 1962 Major League Baseball All-Star Game (second game), a 9–4 victory for the American League over the National League